Breitbach may refer to:

 Breitbach (Main), a river of Bavaria, Germany, tributary of the Main
 Breitbach's Country Dining, a restaurant and bar in Balltown, Iowa, United States

People with that surname
Carl Breitbach (1833–1904), German painter
Joseph Breitbach (1903–1980), French-German playwright, novelist and journalist
Michael Breitbach (born 1956), Iowa State Senator